Patterson is a surname originating in Scotland, Ireland, and Northern England meaning "son of Patrick". There are other spellings, including Pattison and Pattinson. Notable people with the surname Patterson include:

A
Ahmet Patterson (fl. 2010s), English boxer of Turkish Cypriot and Jamaican origin
Alan Patterson (born 1941), New Zealand field hockey player
Alan Patterson (1886–1916), British athlete
Albert Patterson (1894–1954), American politician and assassination victim
Alexander Bell Patterson (1911–1993), Canadian politician
Alvin "Seeco" Patterson (1930–2021), Jamaican percussionist
Ambrose McCarthy Patterson (1877–1967), Australian artist
Andre Patterson (born 1983), American basketball player
Andrew Patterson (cricketer) (born 1975), Irish cricketer
Andrew Patterson (architect) (born 1960) New Zealand architect
Andrew Patterson (Patterson), fictional academic in the 1981 UK radio series Patterson
Anne W. Patterson (born 1949), American diplomat
Arthur Gordon Patterson (1917–1996), British Army general
Arthur Lindo Patterson (1902–1966), Canadian/American physicist

B
Benjamin B. Patterson (1910-1986), American businessman and politician
Beth Patterson (fl. 1990s–2020s), Irish musician
Bobby Patterson (disambiguation)
Brian Patterson (born 1965), Bicycle Motorcross (BMX) racer
L. Brooks Patterson (1939–2019), American politician
Bruce Patterson (disambiguation)

C
C. H. Patterson (1912–2006), American psychologist
Carlile Pollock Patterson (1816–1881), American civil engineer
Carly Patterson (born 1988), American gymnast
Cecil Frederick Patterson (1891–1961), Canadian horticulturalist
Charles E. Patterson (1842–1913), New York politician
Charles Richard Patterson (1833–1910), African-American carriage manufacturer, entrepreneur and civil rights activist
Charlotte Patterson (fl. 1970s–2020s), American psychologist
Christian Patterson (born 1972), American photographer
Christopher Salmon Patterson (1823–1893), Canadian judge
Christopher Stuart Patterson (born 1842), American Dean of the University of Pennsylvania Law School
Eleanor "Cissy" Patterson (1881–1948), American newspaper editor
Clair Cameron Patterson (1922–1995), American geochemist
Claude Patterson (born 1941), American wrestler
Colin Patterson (disambiguation), several people
Cordarrelle Patterson (born 1991), American football player
Corey Patterson (born 1979), American baseball player

D
Daniel Patterson (disambiguation)
Darren Patterson (born 1969), Northern Ireland footballer
David A. Patterson (born 1947), computer science professor at UC Berkeley
David J. Patterson (fl. 1970s–2000s), Irish scientist at Marine Biological Laboratory; generally known as "Paddy" Patterson
David T. Patterson (1818–1891), American politician
Don Patterson (disambiguation)
Duncan Patterson (born 1975), Liverpool born songwriter

E
Ed Patterson (born 1972), Canadian hockey player
Edna Patterson (born 1914), Soviet spy
Eddie Patterson (born 1968), Irish football manager
Eleanor Patterson (born 1996), Australian high jumper
Elizabeth Patterson Bonaparte (1785–1879), first wife of Jérôme Bonaparte
Ellis E. Patterson (1897–1985), American politician
Emma Patterson (1848–1886), British feminist and union activist
Eugene Patterson (1923–2013), American journalist and civil rights activist.

F
Floyd Patterson (1935–2006), world heavyweight champion boxer
Francine Patterson (born 1947), American gorilla researcher, daughter of C. H. Patterson
Frank Patterson (1938–2000), Irish tenor
Frank Harris Patterson (1890—1976), Canadian lawyer and historian
Fredrick Patterson (1871–1932), African-American entrepreneur and first car manufacturer of the Greenfield-Patterson automobile of 1915
Frederick D. Patterson (1901–1988), American veterinarian and college president
Freeman Patterson (born 1937), Canadian photographer

G
Gary Patterson (born 1960), American football coach
Gavin Patterson (born 1967), British business executive
George Patterson (disambiguation), several people
Gil Patterson (born 1955), American baseball player
Gilbert B. Patterson (1863–1922), member of U.S. House of Representatives from North Carolina
Gilbert E. Patterson (1939–2007), American bishop

H
Hank Patterson (1888–1975), American actor and musician
Hannah J. Patterson (1879–1937), American suffragist
Harry Patterson (1929–2022), British novelist who writes as Jack Higgins
Harry Norton Patterson (1853–1919), American printer and botanist
Harry J. Patterson (1866–1946), American college president
Harvey Patterson (1924–2014), Canadian politician
Hayley Patterson, fictional character Hayley Cropper from Coronation Street from 1998 to 2014
A. Holly Patterson (1898–1980), American politician

I
I. L. Patterson (1859–1929), American politician, Oregon Governor
Imani Patterson (fl. 1990s–2000s), actor from the cast of Sesame Street

J
Jaan Patterson (fl. 2000s–2010s), founder of Surrism-Phonoethics
Jake Patterson (fl. 2000s–2020s), American murderer and kidnapper of Jayme Closs
James Patterson (disambiguation), several people
Jane Patterson (fl. 1990s), Canadian judoka
Jane Lippitt Patterson (1829-1919), American writer, editor
Janet Patterson (1956–2016), Australian costume designer 
Jaret Patterson (born 1999), American football player
Javon Patterson (born 1997), American football player
Jerry Patterson (disambiguation), several people including:
 Jerry E. Patterson (born 1946), former Commissioner of the General Land Office of Texas
 Jerry L. Patterson (fl. 1970s–2000s), American author of five gambling related books
 Jerry M. Patterson (born 1934), American politician from California
John Patterson (disambiguation), several people including:
John W. Patterson (1872–1940), nicknamed "Pat", African American baseball player around the turn of the 20th century
John Henry Patterson (author) (1867–1947), Anglo-Irish soldier who wrote The Man-Eaters of Tsavo which was made into the film The Ghost and the Darkness in 1996
John Henry Patterson (Medal of Honor) (1843–1920), recipient of the Medal of Honor
John Henry Patterson (NCR owner) (1844–1922), American businessman who founded the National Cash Register Company
John M. Patterson (1921–2021), American politician, son of Albert Patterson
John Patterson (director) (1940–2005), American film and television director
John Patterson (pitcher) (born 1978), major league pitcher
John Patterson (infielder) (born 1967), former major league infielder
Johnny Patterson (1840–1889) Irish songwriter, musician and circus entertainer
Johnny Patterson (racing driver) (died 1959), former NASCAR Cup Series driver
Joseph Medill Patterson (1879–1946), American journalist and publisher, brother of Eleanor Medill Patterson

K
Kai Patterson (fl. 2020s), filmmaker and creator of Obi-Wan Kenobi: The Patterson Cut
Kathleen Patterson (born 1948), American politician
Kay Patterson (born 1944), Australian politician
Kelsey Patterson (1954–2004), American convicted murderer
Kevin Patterson (writer) (born 1964), Canadian writer
Kevin Patterson (singer) (fl. 1980s–2010s), Scottish songwriter and singer

L
LaFayette L. Patterson (1888–1987), American politician
Leah Patterson, Home and Away character
Lee Patterson (1929–2007), Canadian actor
Sir Les Patterson, fictional Australian from the stage show of Barry Humphries
Liz J. Patterson (1939-2018), American politician
Lloyd Patterson (born 1957), American player of Canadian football
Lorna Patterson (born 1956), American actress
Louise Thompson Patterson (1901–1999), American academic and activist
MC Ren (born Lorenzo Patterson, 1969), American rapper and member of N.W.A
Lyndon Pete Patterson (1934-2017), American politician

M
Malcolm R. Patterson (1861–1935), American politician
Marckell Patterson (born 1979), American basketball player
Marnette Patterson (born 1980), American actress
Marvin Breckinridge Patterson (1905–2002), American photojournalist
Melody Patterson (1949–2015), American actress
Michael Patterson (disambiguation)
Mike Patterson (disambiguation)
Minnie Ward Patterson (1844–1916), American poet and author

N
Neva Patterson (1920–2010), American actress
Neville Patterson (1916–1987), chief justice of the Supreme Court of Mississippi
Nick Patterson (disambiguation)
Norman Patterson (soccer) (1945–2012)

O
Orlando Patterson (born 1940), American historical and cultural sociologist
Ottilie Patterson (1932–2011), Northern Irish blues singer

P
P. J. Patterson (born 1935), Prime Minister of Jamaica
Paige Patterson (born 1942), American Baptist theologian
Pat Patterson (disambiguation), several people
Patrick Patterson (cricketer) (born 1961), Jamaican cricketer
Paul Patterson (disambiguation), several people including:
Paul Patterson (composer) (born 1947), British composer
Paul Patterson (neuroscientist) (1943–2014), an American neuroscientist
Paul Patterson (footballer) (born 1965), an Australian rules footballer
Paul L. Patterson (1900–1956), Governor of the U.S. state of Oregon
Peter Patterson (disambiguation), several people

R
Randall Patterson (born 1977), American adventurer and musician
Ray Patterson (animator) (1911–2001), American animator
Ray Patterson (basketball) (1922–2011), American basketball player
Raymond M. Patterson (1898–1984), British writer and explorer
Reinaldo Patterson (born 1956), Cuban javelin thrower
Richard Patterson (disambiguation), several people
Richard North Patterson (born 1947), American writer
Riley Patterson (born 1998), American football player
Robert Patterson (disambiguation), multiple people
Rufus Lenoir Patterson (1830–1879), American politician and businessman
Russell Patterson (1893–1977), cartoonist
Ruth Patterson (born 1944), Northern Ireland Presbyterian minister

S
Samuel James Patterson (born 1948), Northern Irish mathematician
Sarah Patterson (born c. 1970), actress
Sarah Patterson (coach) (fl. 1970s–2010s), American gymnastics coach
Scott Patterson (curler) (1969–2004), Canadian curler
Scott Patterson (born 1958), American actor
Shea Patterson (born 1997), American football player
Shirley Patterson (1922–1995), Canadian born actress
Sid Patterson (1927–1999), Australian cyclist
Simon Patterson (disambiguation), several people
Stephen Patterson (born 1971), Australian rules footballer
Steve Patterson (basketball) (1948–2004), American basketball player and coach

T
Thomas Patterson (disambiguation), several people
Tyson Patterson (born 1978), American professional basketball player

W
Wilfrid Patterson (1893–1954), Royal Navy Admiral
William Patterson (disambiguation), several people including:
William Albert Patterson (1841–1917), Canadian Member of Parliament
William John Patterson (1886–1976), Canadian Premier of Saskatchewan
William Patterson (engineer) (1795–1869), 19th century engineer and boatbuilder
William Patterson, author of subjects and dialogues for the comic strip Jeff Hawke
William A. Patterson (1899–1980), United Airlines president
William L. Patterson (1891–1980), leader in the Communist Party USA and an African-American civil rights activist
R. William Patterson (1908–1994), American politician
William Worth Patterson (1849–1921), American businessman, mayor, and post office inspector

See also 
Paterson (disambiguation)
Pattinson
Pattison (disambiguation)
Petterson

References

Surnames
English-language surnames
Patronymic surnames
Surnames from given names